Ramu Mech (Assamese: ৰামু মেচ) aliases Prabin Konwar and Sailen Baruah, is a Central Executive Committee Member of the banned outfit ULFA in Assam. He used to be the chief of the outfit's East Zone and also a trusted lieutenant of Arabinda Rajkhowa, the outfit's chairman. He was also elevated to the rank of deputy C-in-C of the outfit's armed wing.

Arrest
In October 2002, while secretly undergoing treatment, he, with his bodyguard, was nabbed by Sibsagar Police from Aditya Diagnostic Centre, Dibrugarh. Now Mech is on parole.

Charges
Cases pending against him are:

See also
ULFA
Sanjukta Mukti Fouj
People's Consultative Group
List of top leaders of ULFA

References

Living people
Indian prisoners and detainees
Prisoners and detainees of India
Prisoners and detainees from Assam
ULFA members
Year of birth missing (living people)